George Macleod was a Scotland international rugby union player.

Rugby Union career

Amateur career

He played for Edinburgh Academicals.

Provincial career

He played for Edinburgh District against Glasgow District in the inter-city match of 1 December 1877.

International career

He played twice for Scotland. His debut was the 4 March 1878 match against England at The Oval.

He second and final cap was against Ireland in Glasgow on 18 February 1882.

Family

He was born to Gordon Macleod and Mary Ramsay Leslie. He had two sisters: Mary Wilhelmina Louisa Macleod and Henrietta Preston Macleod. His mother Mary died when he was only three; his father Gordon died 12 years later.

References

1858 births
Scottish rugby union players
Scotland international rugby union players
Rugby union players from Edinburgh
Edinburgh District (rugby union) players
Edinburgh Academicals rugby union players
Year of death missing
Rugby union forwards